A paid or incentivized survey is a type of statistical survey where the participants/members are rewarded through an incentive program, generally entry into a sweepstakes program or a small cash reward, for completing one or more surveys.

Details 

A paid survey is used to collect quantitative information about the participants' personal and economic habits set against their particular demographic.

Legitimate surveys are usually unpaid (as with a Gallup poll) or incentivized. Surveys where the respondent must pay or purchase products to join a panel are generally scams, as are sites that disappear before paying the participants. Legitimate surveys do not need credit card information from respondents.

See also
Survey data collection
payment methods

References

Survey methodology